"Did I Tell You" is a 1988 song written by Gavin Povey and Augie Meyers and sung by the Swedish singer Jerry Williams. The song also appeared on Williams' 1989 album JW. The song topped Sverigetopplistan, the official Swedish Singles Chart staying at number 1 for 3 consecutive weeks in February and March 1989. It's his only number one single as a solo artist.

Track listing and formats 

 Swedish 7-inch single

A. "Did I Tell You" – 4:14
B. "Let's Do Some Rock 'n' Roll" – 3:42

Credits and personnel 

 Jerry Williams – vocals
 Gavin Povey – songwriter
 Anders Hansson – producer, engineering, mixing
 Ola Håkansson – producer, mixing
 Mats A. Lindberg – producer, engineering
 Per Adebratt – engineering
 Sofia Eklöf – cover art, photographer
 Beatrice Uusma – cover art designer

Credits and personnel adopted from the JW album and 7-inch single liner notes.

Charts

Certifications

References

External links 

 

1989 songs
1989 singles
Jerry Williams (singer) songs
Number-one singles in Sweden